Homeward Bound is an album by Harry Belafonte, released by RCA Records in 1970.

Track listing
 "Homeward Bound" (Paul Simon) – 3:49
 "Sad Heart" (Aufray, Massey) – 4:35
 "The Last Time I Saw Her" (Gordon Lightfoot) – 5:20
 "The Dolphin" (Fred Neil) – 2:54
 "If I Were a Carpenter" (Tim Hardin) – 3:37
 "Don't Talk Now – 3:09
 "Softly" (Lightfoot) – 3:40
 "Suzanne" (Leonard Cohen) – 4:10
 "Tomorrow Is a Long Time" (Bob Dylan) – 3:27
 "Little Bird" (Jerry Jeff Walker) – 4:20

Personnel
Harry Belafonte – vocals
Arranged and conducted by William Eaton
Production notes:
Jack Pleis – producer
Andy Wiswell – producer
Bob Simpson – engineer
Pete Abbott – engineer
Ken Whitmore – cover, liner notes

References

1970 albums
Harry Belafonte albums
RCA Records albums
Albums produced by Jack Pleis